Worsley Old Hall is a public house and restaurant in Worsley, Greater Manchester, England. It is recorded in the National Heritage List for England as a designated Grade II listed building.

History

The present building on the site dates from the 16th or early 17th century. It was originally a timber-framed building which has been rebuilt in brick. It is thought that it originally consisted of a hall range on the south side, with wings extending to the north on the east and west sides. The house was remodelled in the 18th century with the addition of a range immediately to the north of the hall range. It was substantially extended in or around 1855 when an extension was added to the east wing. Further work was carried out in 1891; in 1905 the space between the wings was filled in with a billiard room with a table supplied by Orme and Sons. In 1906 a small wing was added on the northwest side. During the 20th century there were further internal alterations, particularly in the 1990s when it was converted into a restaurant.  The hall is of particular historical importance because it was here that Francis Egerton, the 3rd Duke of Bridgewater, James Brindley and John Gilbert planned the Bridgewater Canal and supervised its building.

Architecture

The building is in brick, most of which is rendered. The roofs are of stone and slate. Some of the 19th-century extensions are timber-framed.

Present day

As of 2011 the building was a public house and restaurant in the Brewers Fayre chain. In August 2013 the building was sold has and been refurbished and re-opened in December 2013 as a food-led real ale pub operated by Brunning and Price.

See also

 Listed buildings in Worsley
 Worsley New Hall

References

External links
Photograph of the hall in 1889

Grade II listed pubs in Greater Manchester
Tourist attractions in Salford
Grade II listed buildings in the City of Salford